Sri Shilpi Siddanthi Siddalinga Swami, (Kannada, ಶ್ರೀ  ಶಿಲ್ಪ ಸಿದ್ಧಾಂತಿ ಸಿದ್ದಲಿಂಗ ಸ್ವಾಮಿ ), (20 Nov 1885 — 11 July 1952), was a Royal Guru of Mysore State and Personal Guru of Maharaja Jayachamarajendra Wadiyar of Mysore. He was also prominent painter, sculptor, architect and writer, known for his contribution to Mysore painting and Architecture.

Early life and career
Sri Siddalinga Swami was born in Kollegal in 1885 to sculptor father Siddappaji and mother Mallajamma and was trained in family profession. Around 1908, he had opportunity to work in Mysore under Maharaja Krishnaraja Wadiyar IV. He composed ‘Manasara’ a bibliography of Indian sculptural art with emphases on Hoysala and early Chalukyan art. His other famous works include 'Gurugita' and 'Shivagita' on sculpture and painting with his own commentary.  Later, he founded a Sculpture School opposite to the Kamakameshwari temple, Mysore. The School was named Jagadguru Shaivashilpa Brahmarshi Gurukula and it was inaugurated by Maharajah Jayachamarajendra Wadiyar in 1949. Sri Siddalinga Swami severed as official palace artiste until his death in 1952.

Gallery

References

1885 births
1952 deaths
Culture of Mysore
20th-century Hindu religious leaders
People from Chamarajanagar district